Genesis 2 or Genesis II may refer to:
 Genesis II (space habitat), an experimental spacecraft launched by Bigelow Aerospace in 2006
 Genesis II (film), a 1973 television film pilot 
 Genesis II Church of Health and Healing, promoter of MMS (known as the "Miracle Mineral Solution") and other sacraments
 Genesis 2 (Bible), chapter 2 of the book of Genesis 
 LAK Genesis 2,  a Standard Class competition glider designed by Jerry Mercer and produced in Lithuania.  
 GENESIS 2, video game tournament held in 2011